Friends in High Places is an album of duets by the American country music artist George Jones, released in 1991. It was Jones's final studio album for Epic Records.

The album peaked at No. 72 on Billboard'''s Top Country Albums chart. "A Few Ole Country Boys", a duet with Randy Travis, was a country music hit.

Production
The album was produced by Billy Sherrill. Its title was inspired by the hit single by Garth Brooks, "Friends in Low Places". 

Critical reception

The Calgary Herald noted that Jones "simply overwhelms bland singers, like Ricky Van Shelton, or forces them to become shrill, like Shelby Lynne." The Dallas Morning News'' wrote that most of the tracks "are overproduced throwaways in which the singers' interplay is so perfunctory that George might as well be faxing in his harmonies."

Track listing

References

External links
George Jones' Official Website
Record Label

George Jones albums
1991 albums
Epic Records albums
Albums produced by Billy Sherrill